Events from the year 1935 in art.

Events
 January – First issue of Axis, a quarterly review of abstract art edited by Myfanwy Piper in England, is published.
 February 15–March 2 – The National Association for the Advancement of Colored People stages an exhibition Art Commentary on Lynching in New York City.
 May 7 – Artists' Unit group of British modernists announced, superseding Unit One.
 December – Elfriede Lohse-Wächtler undergoes forced sterilization in accordance with Nazi eugenics policies and never paints again.
 Gemeentemuseum Den Haag, designed by Hendrik Petrus Berlage, completed in the Netherlands.
 William Coldstream edits the GPO Film Unit documentary Coal Face.
 Picasso's poetry takes precedence over his graphic work this year.

Works

 Pierre Bonnard – Nude in the Bathtub
 Alessandro Bruschetti – Fascist Synthesis
 Óscar Domínguez – Le Dimanche
 Gerardo Dottori – Fascist Creations
 Jacob Epstein – Ecce Homo (marble)
 M. C. Escher – Hand with Reflecting Sphere (lithograph)
 James Earle Fraser – sculptures, Washington, D.C.
 Guardianship
 Heritage
 Frida Kahlo
 A Few Small Nips (Unos cuantos piquetitos)
 Self-Portrait with Curly Hair
 Fernand Léger – Two Sisters
 L. S. Lowry – The Fever Van
 René Magritte
 The Discovery of Fire
 The Human Condition (second version)
 The Portrait
 Joan Miró
 Man and Woman in Front of a Pile of Excrement
 Metamorphosis
 Paul Nash – Equivalents for the Megaliths
 Pablo Picasso – Jeune Fille Endormie
 Candido Portinari – Coffee
 Diego Rivera – The Spanish Conquest of Mexico
 William Rothenstein – Barn at Cherington, Gloucestershire
 Amrita Sher-Gil
 Camels
 Hill Women
 Three Girls
 Kārlis Zāle – Freedom Monument (Riga, Latvia)

Awards
 Archibald Prize: John Longstaff – A B ('Banjo') Paterson
 Knighthood: William Reid Dick

Births
 2 January – David McKee, English author and illustrator
 12 January – Teresa del Conde, Mexican art critic and historian (d. 2017)
 26 January – Paula Rego, Portuguese-born painter (d. 2022)
 10 February – John Alcorn, American illustrator (d. 1992)
 1 June – Vladislav Lalicki, Serbian painter (d. 2008)
 13 June – Christo and Jeanne-Claude, Bulgarian & Moroccan-born American installation artists (d. 2020 & 2009 respectively)
 22 June – Floyd Norman, American animator, writer and comic book artist
 19 August – Victor Ambrus, Hungarian-born British illustrator
 23 August – Roy Strong, English art historian and curator
 8 September – William Vance, Belgian comics artist (d. 2018)
 16 September – Carl Andre, American minimalist artist
 26 September – Juan Zanotto, Italian-born Argentine comic book artist (d. 2005)
 30 September – James McKendry, Northern Irish sculptor and painter
 1 October – Walter De Maria, American minimalist, conceptual artist and land artist (d. 2013)
 3 October – Sinikka Kurkinen, Finnish painter
 9 October – Don McCullin, English war photographer
 Full date unknown
 Nina Alovert, Russian-born American ballet photographer
 Rasheed Araeen, Pakistan-born British conceptual artist
 Félix Arauz, Ecuadorean painter
 John Barry, English film set designer (d. 1979)

Deaths
 February 8 – Max Liebermann, German-Jewish impressionist painter (b. 1847)
 February 16 – Carolina Benedicks-Bruce, Swedish sculptor (b. 1856)
 March 25 – William de Leftwich Dodge, American muralist (b. 1867)
 April 15 – Anna Ancher, Danish member of the Skagen Painters group (b. 1859)
 May 3 – Jessie Willcox Smith, American illustrator (b. 1863)
 May 15 – Kazimir Malevich, Polish-Russian painter, art theoretician (b. 1879)
 May 24 – Granville Redmond, American landscape painter (b. 1871)
 July 17 – George William Russell ('Æ'), Irish critic, poet and painter (b. 1867)
 August 15 – Paul Signac, French neo-impressionist painter (b. 1863)
 August 27 – Childe Hassam, American impressionist painter (b. 1859)
 October 4 – Jean Béraud, French painter (b. 1849)
 October 9 – Archibald Thorburn, Scottish-born wildlife painter (b. 1860)
 October 11 – Samuel Peploe, Scottish painter (b. 1871)
 October 18 – Gaston Lachaise, French-American sculptor (b. 1882)
 October 23 – Charles Demuth, American painter (b. 1883)
 November 28 – Joaquín Clausell, Mexican impressionist landscape painter, lawyer and political activist (b. 1866)
 Undated
 Harry Fidler, English painter (b. 1856)
 Eva Watson-Schütze, American portrait photographer and curator (b. 1867)

See also
 1935 in fine arts of the Soviet Union

References

 
Years of the 20th century in art
1930s in art